Banfa Diakité (born 7 October 1997) is a French professional footballer who plays as an attacking midfielder for Championnat National 2 club Bourges.

Career
Diakité was born in Toulouse in southern France, and played junior football with Toulouse AC and Toulouse FC. However, he was released for being too small and subsequently played one season with Muret in the Division d'Honneur before joining Balma in 2015. During his first season with Balma, he scored six goals in 25 league appearances in the CFA 2.

His performances attracted the attention of several professional teams, and in June 2016 it was announced that he had been signed by Ligue 2 club Amiens. However, the transfer eventually fell through and Diakité returned to Balma for the 2016–17 season. He ended that campaign with an identical record to the previous year of six goals in 25 league matches.

During the summer of 2017, Diakité again courted interest from a number of Ligue 2 clubs. He had trials with Dijon and Nîmes before joining Niort on a two-year contract in May 2017. He made his professional debut in the 4–1 defeat to Valenciennes on 25 August 2017, coming on as a second-half substitute for Antoine Leautey. On 11 November 2017, Diakité scored his first goal for Niort in a 5–1 win over Tournefeuille in the seventh round of the Coupe de France.

Diakité signed for Bourg-en-Bresse on 12 June 2018. On 3 December 2021, he signed for Bourges.

Personal life
Born in France, Diakité is of Guinean descent.

Career statistics

References

External links
 
 

1997 births
Living people
Footballers from Toulouse
French footballers
French sportspeople of Guinean descent
Association football midfielders
AS Muret players
Balma SC players
Chamois Niortais F.C. players
Football Bourg-en-Bresse Péronnas 01 players
US Quevilly-Rouen Métropole players
Bourges Foot 18 players
Championnat National 3 players
Ligue 2 players
Championnat National players
Championnat National 2 players
Black French sportspeople